Fantastic is the second EP by Canadian artist and Super Junior-M member Henry. It was released on July 14, 2014, by S.M. Entertainment in South Korea. The song, along with its music video was also released in Japan in Japanese under Avex Trax as his Japanese debut.

Background 
SM Entertainment revealed that Henry would release his second EP on July 14 and begin his promotional activities. Furthermore, it was stated that the album will contain a total of six tracks, including four written by Henry′s songwriting team, ′NoizeBank'. On July 9, the medley video highlighting the six tracks included in the mini album was revealed though SM Entertainments's official YouTube channel. An image teaser for the "Fantastic" music video was released on July 8. Henry released through several online music sites the music video for "Fantastic", the title song of his upcoming album on July 13, a day before the full album was released. "Fantastic" is described as a retro-pop song and tells the story of a self-centered man who fell in love and wants to become a real man for his loved one. Furthermore, Chanyeol of Exo, Hoya of Infinite and Seulgi of Red Velvet were revealed to be featured in the album.

Henry started his promotion for his album with appearances on Music Bank, Music Core and Inkigayo starting from July 11, 2014. The full album Fantastic was released on July 14.

Track listing
Credits adapted from the official homepage.

Chart performance

Album

Singles

Sales

Release history

References

External links
 Henry Official Website 

Henry Lau EPs
SM Entertainment EPs
Genie Music EPs
2014 EPs
Albums produced by Lee Soo-man
Korean-language EPs